St Augustine's Priory School, is an independent Catholic girls' school in the London Borough of Ealing, England. It was founded and staffed by nuns from the priory, though the school has been run by a lay head since 1996. The school consists of Nursery (3-4) Prep (4–7 years), Junior (7-11) and Senior (11-18) departments and welcomes girls of all faiths. In 2014, it was in the top three best performing GCSE schools in Ealing.

History

Lettice Mary Tredway, CRL, was a member of a French community of Canonesses Regular of the Lateran at the Priory of Notre-Dame-de-Beaulieu in the village of Sin-le-Noble, near Douai, in the County of Flanders, which provided nursing care to the region. She was authorized by the religious authorities, including Bishop Richard Smith, Vicar Apostolic for Great Britain, to found an English-speaking community of her Order. She founded the monastery, called Notre-Dame-de-Sion, in 1631 in Paris.

Shifting from medical care, the school was opened by the community in 1634 for English pupils escaping the persecution of Catholics in their homeland. The priory remained in operation there until the canonesses were forced to flee France at the outbreak of the French Revolution, at which point they returned to England. Finding refuge in their native country, they re-established their religious community and the school under its current name.

The priory moved to Ealing in 1910, to Castlebar Road, and in 1915 moved to its present site in Hillcrest Road.  During the campaign for women's suffrage, one of the school leaders (Headmistress and Latin tutor), Mother Mary Frances, supported this cause by chaining herself to railings and breaking windows.

The Second World War was a difficult time as London was bombed during the Blitz but the school continued operating. Whenever the air raid sirens sounded, canonesses would take the girls down to the cellars and continue lessons.

Although a priory by name, it now consists solely of the school, run by lay staff members, as the canonesses voted in a final meeting in 1996 of the chapter of the priory to dissolve, due to their reduced numbers and the advanced age of its members. They dispersed to join other communities of the Order. The school maintains its Catholic ethos through its pastoral care and has close links with the local archdiocese and the nearby Benedictine Ealing Abbey which hosts the school's annual Carol Concert in December.

Grounds

Facilities
The priory chapel is used daily for school assemblies, masses and music recitals. The new science block provides well equipped science labs, as well as drama studio and Junior music/drama room. Many visitors to the school are envious of the Sixth Form area which has its own balcony with views towards the North Downs, and also has its own kitchen.

Notable former pupils

 Phoebe Waller-Bridge (born 1985) — actress, writer, playwright and director of stage and television
 Hannah Kendall (born 1984) — composer
 Rena Lalgie — civil servant, Governor of Bermuda

References

External links
School website
Profile in the ISC website
ISI Inspection Reports

1630s establishments in France
Monasteries of Canonesses Regular
Augustinian monasteries in France
Augustinian nunneries in England
Christian monasteries established in the 17th century
1996 disestablishments in England
Private schools in the London Borough of Ealing
Educational institutions established in the 1630s
Private girls' schools in London
Augustinian schools
Roman Catholic private schools in the Archdiocese of Westminster